Liverspots and Astronots is an American adult animated comedy series created by Rob Bohn and Nate Milton that premiered on October 18, 2018, on Facebook Watch.

Cast and characters

Main
 Colin Mochrie as Roosi
 Keith David as Dr. Pesh
 Nicole Sullivan as Big Man / Debra

Recurring
 Brennan Lee Mulligan as Lancery / Yuri / Kurt Vonnegut / Jackie & Johnny
 Claire Neumann as Gamblr / Jefferson / Dark Matter / Suzie B
 Maria Bamford as Toothpick / The Yog / Inspector Cabbage / Abrams & Wopsy / Shromp
 John Waters as O-Dor
 Pauly Shore as Fuff
 Selma Blair as Rosie / Inspector Arugula
 Dick Cavett as Montgomery Pesh
 Hearty White as Giant Turtle / HVAC
 Daniel Shepard as Goonter
 Rob Bohn as Terry / Number 2
 Nate Milton as Dumpy / Number 1

Episodes

Production

Development
On September 14, 2018, it was announced that Facebook Watch had given the production a series order for a first season consisting of twenty-one episodes. Production companies involved with the series were slated to consist of digital media company Cartuna.

Casting
Alongside the initial series announcement, it was confirmed that the series would feature the voices of Colin Mochrie, Keith David, Nicole Sullivan, Maria Bamford, John Waters, Pauly Shore, Selma Blair, Dick Cavett and Hearty White.

Premiere
The pilot episode of the series premiered as a sneak peek at the 2018 New York Comic Con.

References

External links

2010s American animated comedy television series
2010s American adult animated television series
2018 American television series debuts
2018 American television series endings
American adult animated comedy television series
American adult animated web series
American comedy web series
English-language television shows
Facebook Watch original programming
Cartuna